Brawdy is a village and community in Pembrokeshire, Wales.

Etymology
The Welsh language name appears to be an archaic form of "Bridget" and the parish may originally have been Llanfreudeth.  The English name is a corruption of the Welsh.

Location 
Brawdy is situated at the northeast corner of St Brides Bay. The southern half of the parish is in the Pembrokeshire Coast National Park. The parish has 4 km of coastline accessible throughout by the Pembrokeshire Coast Path.

The parish includes the villages of Penycwm  and Newgale , and the hamlets of Eweston , Tancredston  and Trefgarn Owen . The parish church of St David is a Grade II* listed building.

Together with the parishes of Llandeloy and Llanreithan, it constitutes the community of Brawdy, which had a census population of 611 in 2001, increasing to 1,012 at the 2011 census.  With the community of Solva, it makes up the Pembrokeshire ward of Solva.

The parish had an area of 2240 Hectares.  Its census populations were: 572 (1801): 753 (1851): 467 (1901): 425 (1951): 798 (1981, of which around 400 were military). The percentage of Welsh speakers was 88% (1891): 72% (1931): 36% (1971). The Pembrokeshire language frontier, known as the Landsker Line, corresponds roughly with the southern boundary of the parish, and it has historically been more Welsh-speaking (excluding military personnel from the Royal Signals Regiment who are based in the former RN and RAF Station).  This is less so today, the 2011 census showed 19.1% of the population could speak Welsh, a fall from 32.2% in 2001.

During the second half of the 20th century, it was home to RAF Station Brawdy, then the large Fleet Air Arm base then back to RNAS Brawdy, later RAF Station and Army Barracks.

Climate

References

External links 

Historical information and sources on GENUKI
Details of the men on the Brawdy War Memorial, inside St David's Church
Military Burials at St David's Church, Brawdy

Villages in Pembrokeshire
Communities in Pembrokeshire